The Ambassador Extraordinary and Plenipotentiary of the Russian Federation to the Argentine Republic is the official representative of the President and the Government of the Russian Federation to the President and the Government of Argentina.

The ambassador and his staff work at large in the Embassy of Russia in Buenos Aires.

History of diplomatic relations

The Russian Empire maintained consulates in Argentina during the early twentieth century. These represented Russian interests in the country until 1909, after which relations were maintained through the embassy in Brazil, with  acting as charge d'affaires. Shtein was appointed the first envoy to Argentina in 1916, and continued after the February Revolution in 1917 as representative of the Russian Provisional Government. After the Bolshevik seizure of power in the October Revolution that year, Shtein's accreditation was revoked on 26 November 1917. The Argentine government continued to recognize him as the Russian envoy however, and he functioned in this role into the 1930s, during which there was no official representation from the USSR. 

Official relations between the Soviet Union and the Argentine Republic were established in June 1946, with the first ambassador, appointed on 12 July 1946, and presenting his credentials on 12 September that year. With the dissolution of the Soviet Union in 1991, the Soviet ambassador, continued as representative of the Russian Federation until 1993.

Representatives

Representatives of the Russian Empire to Argentina (1900 - 1917)

Representatives of the Soviet Union to Argentina (1946 - 1991)

Representatives of the Russian Federation to Argentina (1991 - present)

References

 
Argentina
Russia